Valene Maharaj (born April 25, 1986) was the Miss Trinidad and Tobago 2007  title holder, and Miss World of the Caribbean for 2007. She has been active in the fashion business since she was sixteen years old. Her modelling career started when she won the Caribbean Model Search, which took her to Jamaica in 2003 for Jamaica's Fashion Week. Since then she's done advertising campaigns for Micles, modelled in shows for local designers like Peter Elias and Meiling.

Maharaj won the Miss Trinidad & Tobago 2007 title; she succeeded over six other contestants.

Maharaj was the third runner up in Miss World 2007 in China.

Early life and education
Maharaj grew up in a small village in the southern part of Trinidad & Tobago called St. Margaret's in Claxton Bay.

Personal life
She is the daughter of Mr. Ashuk and Mrs. Sumintra

References

External links 

1986 births
Living people
Trinidad and Tobago people of Indian descent
Trinidad and Tobago beauty pageant winners
Miss World 2007 delegates
Trinidad and Tobago female models